

Current listings

|}

Former listings

|}

Notes

References 

 
Washington County